Spiken is a locality situated in Lidköping Municipality, Västra Götaland County, Sweden

Populated places in Västra Götaland County
Populated places in Lidköping Municipality